Kolonjë  is a municipality in Korçë County, southeastern Albania. It was created in 2015 by the merger of the former municipalities Barmash, Çlirim, Ersekë, Leskovik, Mollas, Novoselë, Qendër Ersekë and Qendër Leskovik. The seat of the municipality is the town Ersekë. It is an ethnographic region.

Location
Kolonjë is located in south-east Albania and its capital is Ersekë. Other towns in this district include Leskovik to the south. It is bounded by Korçë to the north and Greece to the east, including the regional units of Kastoria and Ioannina. The town of Ersekë is located at the foot of mount Gramos, Albania's fourth-highest mountain with a peak at 2,525 m above sea level.

History
During the Middle Ages a region under the name Koloneia is located in the mountain region south of Korçë (southeast Albania) and north of Konitsa and Kastoria (northwestern Greece) at the west slopes of Grammos mountain range. A Byzantine military garrison under the same name was built west of Grammos.

At 1040s the theme of Koloneia was incorporated to the Duchy of Dyrrachion. After the Sack of Constantinople at 1204 and the following partition of the Byzantine Empire Koloneia was granted to the Republic of Venice. However, Koloneia came under the control of the Despotate of Epirus and formed one of the themes of the Despotate. Following the Battle of Pelagonia in 1259 Koloneia was ceded to the Empire of Nicaea.

In a text by Emperor John VI Kantakouzenos (r. 1347-1354) whose 'History' covers the years 1320-1356, there is mention of local Albanians;  “While the emperor was spending about eight days in Achrida (Ohrid), the Albanian nomads living in the region of Deabolis (Devoll) appeared before him, as well as those from Koloneia (Kolonja) and those from the vicinity of Ohrid.” This meeting was estimated to have taken place at around February 1328.

One source says that one of the two main waves of Albanian movements coming from the north entered Kolonjë in the 14th century, with the wave also affecting the neighboring Dangëllia region. The name Kolonja is related to the Roman period of the area.

Villages, communities and settlements

 Barmash
 Bezhan
 Blush
 Borovë
 Butkë
 Çlirim
 Ersekë
 Gjonc
 Gërmenj
 Gostivisht
 Helmës
 Kabash
 Kagjinas
 Kaltanj
 Kamnik
 Kodras
 Kozel
 Kreshovë
 Kurtez
 Lashovë
 Lëngëz
 Lënckë
 Leshnjë
 Leskovik
 Luaras
 Mesicke
 Milec
 Mollas
 Novoselë
 Orgockë
 Piskal
 Podë
 Postenan
 Prodan
 Psarr i Zi
 Qafzes
 Qesarakë
 Qinam Radovickë
 Qinam
 Qytezë
 Radimisht
 Radanj
 Rehovë
 Selenicë e Pishës
 Shalës
 Shtikë
 Shën Mërtir
 Starje
 Taç
 Vodicë
 Vrepckë

Notable people 
 Sali Njazi, 1st Dedebaba of the Bektashi Order

References

Sources
 

Municipalities in Korçë County
 
Albanian ethnographic regions